Eedu Jodu is a 1963 Indian Telugu-language film produced and directed by K. B. Tilak. The film stars Jaggayya, Jamuna, Gummadi, Chalam and Manimala. It was released on 17 May 1963 and became a commercial success. The director remade the film in Hindi in 1971 as Kangan.

Plot

Cast 
 Jaggayya as Venu
 Jamuna as Santha
 Gummadi as Lakshmipathy
 Chalam as Anji
 Manimala as Sobha
 T. V. Ramana Reddy as Chalapati
 Chadalavada as Rangamma's husband
 K. V. S. Sharma as Lakshmipathy's guru
 Suryakantham as Rangamma
 Hemalatha as Sundaramma
 Malathi as Parvathamma
 Allu Ramalingaiah as Ramalingachari

Production 
Eedu Jodu was produced and directed by K. B. Tilak under Anupama Films, and written by S. R. Pinisetty. Cinematography was handled by V. V. Ram Chowdary, and editing by C. H. Venkateswara Rao. The film was the debut of Manimala, who played Sobha, in Telugu cinema. While some scenes were shot at Narasu Studios and Prasad Productions, Eedu Jodu was predominantly filmed in a bungalow owned by Tilak's friend, Ch. Subbarao in Nungambakkam, Madras. The song "Idhemi Lahiri Idhemi Gaaradi" was filmed at Mahabalipuram, and K. S. Prakash Rao directed the song "Pancharu Pancharu Pancharu" at Tilak's request as Tilak had other commitments. When Tilak contracted fever, he asked his friend Pratibha Sastri to direct a scene picturised on Venu (Jaggayya) and Santha (Jamuna) to avoid production delays; Sastri agreed, and completed a day's work. A scene where Lakshmipathy (Gummadi) asks Santha to remove her mangala sutra was found to be objectionable by G. P. Sastry of the Censor Board, so it was removed and replaced with a divorce scene.

Soundtrack 
The soundtrack was composed by Pendyala, and the lyrics were written by Aarudra.

Release and reception 
Eedu Jodu was released on 17 May 1963, and became a commercial success. The film was remade in Hindi as Kangan (1971), with Tilak again directing.

References

External links 
 

1960s Telugu-language films
Films directed by K. B. Tilak
Telugu films remade in other languages